The Four Sacred Mountains of the Navajo are the four mountains along the boundaries of the Navajo Nation. According to Navajo belief, each mountain is assigned a color and direction and is seen as a deity that provides essential resources for Navajo livelihood. However, these sacred mountains have been mistreated recently, leading to unfavorable consequences for the Navajo community. The destruction of sacred places of power can release dangerous power, which the Navajo attribute to the seen social disintegration in today's society. The following highlights the importance of respecting indigenous beliefs and protecting sacred sites for the well-being of all communities.

Geographical location 
The Navajo attribute supernatural power to geographic features, especially mountains, which they consider to be deities. The four sacred mountains in the cardinal directions of Navajo Country hold great importance. They are named in sunwise order and associated with the colors of the four cardinal directions: Sisnaajiní or Blanca Peak (blue in the east), Tsoodził or Mt. Taylor (yellow in the south), Doko’oosłííd or the San Francisco Peaks (black in the west), and Dibéntsaa or Hesperus Peak (white in the north). These mountains are located in south-central Colorado, Grants, New Mexico, Flagstaff, Arizona, and La Plata Mountains, Colorado in relation to the U.S.

Spiritual attributes 
According to a narrative from Father Berard Haile, the color scheme of each peak was based on observations of the land from the Navajo's initial settlement in the area. The inner forms of each pole are oriented in a clockwise fashion, and their descriptions are linked to the previous pole's color. For example, Dawn Boy in the east has the white of dawn, which is the color of the north. Blue Sky Man in the south has the keystone form of the blue daytime sky, which is the color of the east. Yellow Evening Light Girl in the west is of yellow twilight, which is the color of the south. Darkness Girl in the north is surrounded by darkness, or black, the color of the west.

Orderly and proper conditions include complementarity, where Navajos view day and night as necessary parts of the same entity, and neither is morally better than the other. This concept is similar to the Asian idea of yin and yang, where each component is incomplete without the other. Male and female, life and death, and good and evil are all complementary states that are interrelated and interdependent in the universe.

The four sacred mountains represent the essence of life and cosmic harmony for the Navajo. They hold the sacred stories of their ancestors and all those who have inhabited the area throughout history. These stories are deeply intertwined with the Navajo culture and way of life, serving as a source of guidance and wisdom for the present and future generations. The mountains are also viewed as a living entity that has witnessed the arrival and departure of people from various tribes and races over time, further highlighting their importance as a place of shared history and cultural heritage. Despite the passage of time and the changes that have occurred, the Navajo people continue to hold these sacred places in high regard, recognizing their enduring spiritual and cultural significance. The necessities of the Navajo, such as food, water, timber, and vegetation, flow through them. By cherishing these mountains and not wasting resources, the Navajo can earn their livelihood.

Recent defilement of the sacred mountains 
The sacred mountains have been subjected to what is considered defilement and destruction at the hands of not only Anglo-Americans but also some tribal authorities, who have allowed development and resource extraction projects to take place on the sacred sites. These activities have resulted in the physical destruction of the mountains, as well as the disruption of the spiritual balance of the land.

In fact, the Navajo attribute the social disintegration seen in today's society to the desecration of their sacred sites. They believe that the loss of respect for the land and its spiritual significance has contributed to a breakdown in the social fabric of their communities. This includes the erosion of traditional values, the rise of substance abuse and other social problems, and a general sense of alienation and disconnection from the land and its spiritual traditions.

Overall, the defilement and destruction of sacred sites is a source of great concern for the Navajo people, who view the preservation and protection of these places as essential to their cultural survival and spiritual well-being.

References 

Wikipedia Student Program